Juice Cubes is a match 3 puzzle video game developed by Pocket PlayLab and published by Rovio Stars, as its second title, for iOS and Android. It is also available as a Facebook app, so it may be played on PC with a web browser.

Gameplay
The gameplay of Juice Cubes is to connect at least 3 fruits of the same color, while trying to finish certain goals, e.g. getting certain numbers of points or removing sand tiles from the grid. Whenever the player connects four or more cubes, a bomb fruit appears that can destroy fruits on a row or column when matched upon. When diagonally formed, it will create a bomb fruit that destroys fruit in a 3×3 area. When players connect 8 or more fruits, they create a fruit that removes from the grid the fruit of the same color the special fruit is connected with. As of January 2016, there are 550 levels. 

Additional lives or in-game powerups may be purchased with real money.

References

2013 video games
Browser games
Facebook games
IOS games
Android (operating system) games
Puzzle video games
Video games developed in Thailand
Tile-matching video games
Rovio Entertainment games